Ricardo Ojeda Lara (born 26 January 1993) is a Spanish tennis player.

Ojeda Lara has a career high ATP singles ranking of 171 achieved on 9 October 2017. He also has a career high doubles ranking of 549 achieved on 10 September 2018.

Ojeda Lara has won 1 ATP Challenger singles title at the 2017 Bucher Reisen Tennis Grand Prix.

Tour titles

Singles

References

External links
 
 

1993 births
Living people
Spanish male tennis players
Sportspeople from Valencia
People from El Puerto de Santa María
Sportspeople from the Province of Cádiz
Tennis players from Andalusia